is the 30th single by Japanese singer and voice actress Nana Mizuki, released on October 15, 2014 by King Records.

Track listing 
 "Kindan no Resistance" (禁断のレジスタンス, Forbidden Resistance)
Lyrics: Nana Mizuki
Composition: Yusuke Kato
Arrangement: Yusuke Kato
Opening theme for anime television series Cross Ange: Rondo of Angels and Dragons 
 "Blue"
Lyrics: Nana Mizuki
Composition: Yoshiki Eriko
Arrangement: Hitoshi Fujima (Elements Garden)
Theme song for anime movie Space Battleship Yamato 2199: Tsuioku no Kōkai 
 "Dream Rider" (ドリームライダー)
Lyrics: Nana Mizuki, Sayuri
Composition: Yusuke Kato
Arrangement: Jun Suyama

Charts
Oricon Sales Chart (Japan)

References

2014 singles
Nana Mizuki songs
Songs written by Nana Mizuki
2014 songs
King Records (Japan) singles